The 1985 Honduran Segunda División was the 19th season of the Honduran Segunda División.  Under the management of Rafael Núñez, E.A.C.I. won the tournament after finishing first in the final round (or Cuadrangular) and obtained promotion to the 1986–87 Honduran Liga Nacional.

Final round
Also known as Cuadrangular.

Standings

Known results

References

Segunda
1985